Acianthera miqueliana is a species of orchid.

miqueliana